George F. "Pete" Lohman (October 21, 1864 – November 21, 1928), was an American professional catcher in Major League Baseball for the 1891 Washington Statesmen. He played in the minor leagues through 1905 and also managed in the minor leagues in parts of six seasons.

External links

1864 births
1928 deaths
People from Washington County, Minnesota
Major League Baseball catchers
Baseball players from Minnesota
19th-century baseball players
Washington Statesmen players
Sacramento Altas players
Leadville Blues players
Oakland Colonels players
Los Angeles Seraphs players
Phillipsburg Burgers players
Los Angeles Angels (minor league) players
Milwaukee Brewers (minor league) players
Omaha Omahogs players
St. Joseph Saints players
Des Moines Prohibitionists players
London Cockneys players
Sacramento Gilt Edges players
Oakland Oaks (baseball) players
London Tecumsehs (baseball) players
Oakland Commuters players
Denver Grizzlies (baseball) players
Oakland Clamdiggers players
Minor league baseball managers